Temblor may refer to:
 Temblor (The Batman), Batman villain
 Temblor Range, mountain range in California
 Temblor, another name for earthquake
 On pipe organs, tremulant
 Temblor, Inc., a startup dealing with seismic risk